Charaxes candiope, the green-veined emperor or green-veined charaxes, is a butterfly of the family Nymphalidae. It is common in sub-Saharan Africa.

Biology
The habitat is forest and savanna excluding arid savanna. It also occurs in gardens and agricultural areas. Notes on the biology of candiope are given by Pringle et al (1994), Larsen, T.B. (1991), Larsen, T.B. (2005) and Kielland, J. (1990).
Flight period is from October to June.

Description

The wingspan is 45–55 mm in males and 50–60 mm in females. The basic colour of the upperside wings is tawny or orange tawny, with a basal area slightly paler or pale ochre yellow.  The unscaled veins and the costal edge of forewing are green. The hindwings have a submarginal black band with a series of tawny ochreous or whitish interstitial spots. The undersides of the forewings are clayish, slightly ochreous, while the hindwings are sepia colour. Forewings are rather falcate, while the hindwings have two small tails protruding from the lower edge.

Full description
A full description is given by Walter Rothschild and Karl Jordan, 1900 Novitates Zoologicae volume 7:287-524.  page 364 et seq. (for terms see Novitates Zoologicae volume 5:545-601 )

Life history
Larvae have large green bodies and heads decorated with horns. They feed on Croton sylvaticus, Croton gratissimus, and Croton megalocarpus.

Distribution
This species can be found in most of the Afrotropical realm (Sub-Saharan Africa).

Taxonomy
Charaxes candiope group. The group members are:

Charaxes candiope
Charaxes antamboulou like next
Charaxes cowani like last
Charaxes velox
Charaxes thomasius

References

Victor Gurney Logan Van Someren, 1974 Revisional notes on African Charaxes (Lepidoptera: Nymphalidae). Part IX. Bulletin of the British Museum of Natural History (Entomology) 29 (8):415-487. 
Seitz, A. Die Gross-Schmetterlinge der Erde 13: Die Afrikanischen Tagfalter. Plate XIII 32

External links
Charaxes candiope images at Consortium for the Barcode of Life
Images of C. candiope candiope Royal Museum for Central Africa (Albertine Rift Project)
 Biodiversity Explorer
 Tolweb
 Outdoorphoto
African Butterfly Database Range map via search

candiope
Butterflies described in 1824
Butterflies of Africa